This list of marine gastropod genera in the fossil record is an attempt to list all the genera of sea snails or marine gastropod  mollusks which have been found in the fossil record. Nearly all of these are genera of shelled forms, since it is relatively rare for gastropods without a shell (sea slugs) to leave any recognizable traces. It is also worth pointing out that this list of genera represents only a very tiny fraction of the number of genera that must actually have existed over the evolutionary time span: the fossil record is an extremely patchy and exceedingly incomplete pteryrecord of life on earth in earlier geological eras.

Many genera on this list are still extant, are still living now. On the current version of this list, some extant genera are mistakenly marked as extinct, with a "†" next to the name, but this should slowly become more accurate over time as corrections are made.

The list consists of formal genera names in the class Gastropoda; it excludes purely vernacular names. It shows all commonly accepted genera, but it also includes genera which are now considered invalid or doubtful (nomina dubia), and names that were not formally published (nomina nuda), as well as junior synonyms of more established names.

The list also includes some genera which were first described as gastropods, but which are no longer considered to be gastropods, and which in many cases are not even considered to be mollusks.

Genera are listed here alphabetically; no attempt has been made to group them in families or other higher taxa.

A

Abderospira
†Abretiella
†Abylea
†Acamptochetus
†Acamptogenotia
 Acanthina
†Acanthinucella
†Acanthonema
†Acanthotrophia
†Aciculiscala
†Acilia
 Acirsa
†Acirsella
†Acliceratia
Aclis
†Aclisina
 Acmaea
†Acmaturris
†Acme
†Acominia
†Acrilla
†Acrilloscala
†Acrocoelum
†Acrocolpus
†Acrocosmia
†Acroreia
†Acrosolarium
†Acrospira
†Acrostemma
†Acrostylus
 Actaeon
†Actaeonella
†Actaeonellina
†Actaeonema
†Actaeonidea
†Actaeonina
†Actaeopyramis
 Acteocina
 Actinoleuca
†Actinopsis
†Actomphalus
†Acuminia
†Acupurpura
†Adamnestia
†Adelocythara
 Adelomelon
†Ademtula
†Adeorbis
†Adinus
†Adiozoptyxis
†Admete
†Admetopsis
†Adusta
†Aehmospira
†Aeneator
†Aepystoma
†Aequispirella
 Aesopus
†Afer
†Affiniptyxis
†Affrollonia
†Aforia
†Africoterebellum
†Afriscrobs
†Afrocornulina
†Afrocypraea
†Afrovolutilithes
 Agaronia
†Agasoma
 Agatha
†Agathirses
†Agathistoma
†Agathodonta
†Agathotoma
†Agatrix
†Ageria
†Agladrillia
†Aglaoglypta
†Agnesia
†Agnewia
†Agniesella
†Aiptospira
†Aizyella
†Akburunella
 Akera
 Alaba
†Alabina
†Alaionema
†Alariopsis
†Alaskacirrus
†Alaskiella
†Alaskozygopleura
†Alcidiella
†Alcira
Alcithoe
†Aldrichia
Alectrion
Aletes
†Algaroda
 Alia
 Aliculastrum
†Aliger
†Aliofusus
†Allocosmia
†Allostrophia
†Alocaxis
†Alocospira
†Altaspiratella
†Altivasum
†Altomarginula
†Altrix
 Alvania
 Alvinia
 Amaea
 Amalda
†Amarophos
†Amaura
†Amaurellina
†Amauropsina
†Amauropsis
†Amauropsona
†Amaurotoma
†Amberleya
†Amblyacrum
†Ambozone
†Amekichilus
†Amekicythara
†Ameranella
†Amonilea
†Amorena
Amoria
†Ampezzamilda
†Ampezzoella
†Ampezzogyra
†Ampezzopleura
†Ampezzoscala
†Ampezzotrochus
†Amphinerita
†Amphiperas
†Amphiscapha
 Amphissa
†Amphithalamus
†Amphitomaria
†Amphitrochus
†Amplicolpus
†Amplogladius
†Amplosipho
†Amplostoma
 Ampulla
†Ampullella
†Ampullina
†Ampullinopsis
†Ampullospira
†Ampulonatica
†Amuletum
†Amyclina
†Amyssodropa
 Anachis
†Anacithara
†Ananias
†Anapepta
†Anapetopsis
†Anarconcha
†Anastes
Anatoma
†Anazola
†Anbullina
†Anceps
†Anchura
 Ancilla
†Ancillarina
†Ancillina
Ancillista
†Ancillopsis
†Ancistrolepis
†Ancistromesus
†Ancistrosyrinx
†Anculosa
†Andangularia
†Andicula
†Andonia
†Anematina
†Aneurychilus
†Aneurystoma
 Angaria
†Anguillospira
†Angularia
†Angyomphalus
†Anisomyon
†Anisostoma
†Annepona
†Anodomaria
†Anomalisipho
†Anomalofusus
†Anomalomya
†Anomphalus
†Anoptychia
†Anoriostoma
†Anozyga
†Ansates
†Antarctodarwinella
†Anteglossia
†Antepepta
†Anticlimax
†Anticonulus
†Antiguraleus
†Antillachelus
 Antillophos
†Antimelatoma
†Antimitra
†Antinodulus
 Antiplanes
Antisolarium
†Antitrochus
†Antizafra
†Aoteadrillia
†Apachella
†Apataxia
†Aphanoptyxis
†Aphanotaenia
†Aphera
†Apicaria
†Apiocypraea
†Apiotoma
†Aplocus
 Aplustrum
 Apollon (synonym of Ranella)
 Aporrhais
†Appisania
†Aptycholathyrus
†Aptyxiella
†Aptyxis
†Aquilofusus
†Araeodactylus
†Araeonema
†Araratella
†Arastra
†Arayina
†Archicypraea
†Archierato
Archimediella
†Archinacella
Architectonica
 Arctomelon
†Arcularia
†Aremella
 Arene
†Arestorides
†Argalista
†Arginula
 Argobuccinum
†Argyrobessa
†Argyropeza
†Ariadnaria
†Arisostoma
†Aristerella
†Aristerostrophia
†Arizonella
†Arjamannia
†Armenostoma
†Arrhoges
†Arribazona
†Arthessidae
†Ascensovoluta
†Ascolatirus
†Aspa
 Aspella
†Asperdaphne
†Asperilla
†Asperiscala
†Aspidotheca
†Astandes
 Astele
Asteracmea
†Asterohelix
†Asthenotoma
 Astraea
†Astralites
 Astralium
 Astyris
 Atalacmea
†Ataphropsis
†Ataphrus
†Ataxocerithium
†Ataxotrochus
†Athleta
 Atilia
†Atira
†Atkinsonella
 Atlanta
†Atlantobellerophon
†Atoma
†Atractotrema
†Atraktus
†Atresius
†Atrimitra
†Attenuata
 Attiliosa
 Atys
†Aulacodiscus
†Aulacofusus
†Aulacostrepsis
†Aulica
†Aulicina
†Aurelianella
†Auriala
†Aurina
†Auriptygma
†Auristomia
†Auseria
†Austerum
†Australolaxispira
†Australonema
†Austriacopsis
†Austroaporrhais
†Austroclavus
†Austrocochlis
†Austrocominella
†Austrocypraea
†Austrodrillia
†Austrofusus
†Austroharpa
†Austrolithes
†Austromitra
†Austrosassia
†Austroscalata
†Austrosphaera
†Austrotoma
†Austrotriton
†Austrotrophon
†Austroworthenia
†Avellana
†Awateria
†Axelella
†Axymene

B

†Babella
†Babylonella
 Babylonia
†Babylonites
†Bactrocythara
†Bactroptyxis
†Bactrospira
 Bailya
†Bajanerita
†Bakonyia
 Balcis
†Balinula
†Bandelium
†Bandellina
†Banis
†Bankivia
†Barbarofusus
†Barbotella
 Barleeia
†Barnesella
†Barocospira
†Barrandecirrus
†Barrealispira
†Barroisucaulus
Bartonia
Bartschella (synonym of Turbonilla)
†Barycypraea
Baryspira (synonym of Amalda)
†Basilirata
†Basilissa
†Basilitrona
†Bassotrochus
†Bastropia
†Bathraspira
†Bathrotomaria
Bathybembix
†Bathyclides
†Bathygalea
†Bathytoma
Batillaria
†Batillona
†Bauxia
†Bayania
†Baylea
†Bedeva
†Beisselia
†Bela
†Belatomina
 Bellaspira
†Bellastraea
†Bellatara
†Bellazona
†Bellerophina
†Bellerophon
†Bellifusus
†Belliscala
†Belloliva
†Belonidium
†Belophos
†Bembexia
†Bembicium
†Bembridgia
†Bendeia
†Benoistea
†Benthomangelia
†Beraua
†Beraunia
†Beretra
†Beringius
†Berlieria
†Bernaya
†Berthelinia
 Besla
†Beyrichidiscus
†Bezanconia
†Biangularia
†Bicarina
†Bicarinella
†Bicatillus
†Bifidoscala
†Biformispira
†Bifurcium
†Bigotella
†Billiemia
†Biplex
†Biplica
 Bittiolum
†Bittiscala
 Bittium
†Bivetiella
†Bivetopsia
†Bivonia
†Blackdownia
†Blancia
†Blasicrura
†Boeckhia
†Boehmiola
†Boettgeriola
†Boggsia
†Bohaispira
†Bohaispiropsis
†Boiotremus
 Bolinus
†Bolis
†Bolma
†Boltenella
†Bonellitia
†Bonnetella
†Boreocomitas
†Boreoscala
 Boreotrophon
†Borestus
†Borsonella
†Borsonia
†Boucotspira
†Boucotspira
†Bourgetia
†Boutillieria
†Bovicornu
†Bowdenagaza
†Bowdenatheca
†Brachycerithium
†Brachycythara
†Brachysphingus
†Brachystoma
†Brachystomia
†Brachytoma
†Brachytomaria
†Brachytrema
†Bradyospira
†Bramertonia
†Bridegeina
†Bridegeites
†Brilonella
†Brocchia
†Brocchinia
†Brocchitas
†Brochidium
†Brochina
†Brookesena
 Brookula
†Brouzetia
†Bruclarkia
†Brunonia
†Bubovicus
†Bucanella
†Bucania
†Bucanoides
†Bucanopsis
†Bucanospira
†Buccinanops
†Buccinaria
†Buccinofusus
†Buccinopsis
†Buccinorbis
†Buccinulum
 Buccinum
†Buccitriton
†Bucconia
†Buchozia
†Buckmanina
†Buechelia
†Bufonariella
†Bulbihastula
†Bulbus
†Bulimactaeon
†Bulimorpha
 Bulla
Bullata
†Bullia
†Bullina
†Bulliopsis
†Bullopsis
†Bulovia
†Burdikinia
 Bursa
†Burtinella
 Buscotypus
 Busycon
†Buvignieria
†Byramia
†Byzantia

C

†Cabania
†Cabestanna
 Caecum
†Caesia
†Calaurops
†Calcarata
†Calcitrapessa
†Calicantharus
†Caliendrum
†Callianax
†Calliobasis
†Calliomphalus
 Calliostoma
†Calliotectum
†Calliotropis
†Calliovarica
†Callispira
†Callistadia
†Callistele
†Callistocypraea
†Callitomaria
†Callolongchaeus
†Callopoma
†Callotrochus
†Callusaria
†Calodisculus
†Calophos
†Calorebama
  Calotrophon
†Calpurna
†Calthalotia
†Calvadosiella
†Calverturris
 Calyptraea
†Calyptraphorus
†Calyptroides
†Calyptropsis
†Camarnia
†Cambodgia
†Campanelle
†Campanile
†Campanilopa
†Campbellospira
†Campichia
†Camponaxis
†Camponeila
†Camposcala
†Camptoceratops
†Campylacrum
†Canaliscala
Canarium (synonym of Strombus (Canarium) )
†Cancellaria
†Cancellariella
†Cancelrana
†Cancilla
†Candinia
†Canepina
Cantharidella
 Cantharidus
†Cantharulus
 Cantharus
†Cantrainea
†Capulacmaea
†Capulus
†Carboninia
†Cardinalia
†Careliopsis
†Caribiella
†Caricella
†Carinacca
Carinaria
†Carinaropsis
†Carinator
†Carinodrillia
†Carinomphalus
†Carinotropsis
†Carota
†Caseyella
†Casimiria
  Casmaria
†Cassianastraea
†Cassianaxis
†Cassianebala
†Cassianilda
†Cassianocirrus
†Cassianozyga
†Cassidaria
†Cassiope
†Cassiopella
†Cassipelia
 Cassis
†Catantostoma
†Cataschisma
†Catazona
†Catazone
†Catenoscala
†Catenotoma
†Catilon
†Caucasella
†Cautotriphora
†Caveola
†Cavernisa
†Cavilabium
†Caviumbonia
 Cavolina
†Celatoconus
 Cellana
†Cenomanella
†Centrifuga
†Centrifugus
†Cepatia
†Ceratia
†Ceratopea
†Ceratostoma
†Ceraunocochlis
†Ceritella
 Cerithidea
†Cerithideops
†Cerithideopsilla
†Cerithideopsis
  Cerithidium
†Cerithiella
†Cerithina
†Cerithinella
†Cerithioclava
†Cerithiocyga
†Cerithioderma
†Cerithioides
†Cerithiomorpha
†Cerithiopsida
†Cerithiopsidella
 Cerithiopsis
†Cerithiscala
 Cerithium
†Cerithopsina
†Chalarostrepsis
†Charadreum
 Charonia
†Chartroniella
†Chasmotheca
†Chauvetia
†Chavanicerithium
†Chedevillia
 Cheilea
†Cheilospicata
†Cheilotomona
†Chelotia
†Chelyconus
†Chemnitzia
†Chepultapecia
†Chesaclava
†Chesasyrinx
†Chesathais
†Chesatrophon
†Chevallieria
 Chicoreus
†Chileutomia
†Chilocyclus
†Chilodonta
†Chilodontoidea
†Chingua
†Chippewaella
†Chiralithes
†Chiraluta
†Chlathrus
 Chlorostoma
†Chlupacispira
†Chondrocerithium
†Chorus
†Christitys
†Chrysallida
†Chrysame
†Chrysostoma
†Cibecuia
†Cidarina
†Cigelirina
†Cilara
†Cimoliocentrum
†Cimolithium
†Cinclidonema
†Cinctiscala
  Cingula
Cingulina
†Cinguliturris
†Cinulia
†Circulopsis
†Circuloscala
†Circulus
†Cirillia
†Cirrus
†Cirsocerithium
†Cirsochilus
†Cirsomphalus
Cirsonella
†Cirsope
†Cirsostylus
Cirsotrema
 Cittarium
†Claibornia
†Clanculopsis
 Clanculus
†Clathrobaculus
 Clathrodrillia
 Clathromangelia
†Clathronema
†Clathroscala
†Clathrospira
†Clathrus
†Clathurella
†Clava
†Clavatula
†Clavellofusus
†Clavidrupa
†Clavilithes
†Claviscala
†Clavocerithium
†Clavstoma
†Clavus
†Cleobula
†Cleotrivia
†Clifdenia
†Climacina
†Climacopoma
†Clinopegma
†Clinura
†Clinurella
†Clinuropsis
 Clio
†Clivuloturris
†Closia
†Closteriscus
†Closteroides
†Cloughtonia
†Clypeola
†Clypeolum
†Clypeomorus
†Clypidina
†Coalingodea
†Coanollonia
†Coccopigya
†Cocculina
†Cocculinella
†Cochiolepis
†Cochleochilus
 Cochlespira
†Cochlespirella
†Cochlespiropsis
†Cochliconus
†Codinella
†Codonocheilus
†Coelobolma
†Coelocaulus
†Coelocentrus
†Coelochrysalis
†Coelocyclus
†Coelodiscus
†Coeloscapha
†Coelostylina
†Coelotrochus
†Coelozone
†Coemansia
†Colina
†Collabrina
†Colliculus
†Collina
 Collisella
†Collonia
†Collonista
†Colostracon
†Colpites
†Colpomphalus
†Colposigma
†Colpospira
†Colpostomia
 Colubraria
†Colubrella
†Colubrellina
 Columbarium
 Columbella
†Columbellaria
†Columbellina
†Columbellisipho
†Columbellopsis
 Colus
†Coluzea
†Colwellia
†Comarmondia
†Cominella
†Cominista
†Cominula
†Comitas
†Commonozonispira
 Compsodrillia
†Compsonema
†Conactaeon
Concholepas
†Conchothyra
†Concinnispira
†Confusiscala
†Conilithes
†Coninoda
†Coniscala
 Conjectura
†Conocerithium
†Conoidacmaea
†Conolithes
†Conominolia
†Conomitra
†Conomurex
†Conorbis
†Conorhytis
†Conotoma
†Conotomaria
†Consobrinella
†Contemniscala
†Contortella
†Conuber
Conus
†Cookia
†Cophocara
†Copidocatomus
†Coptochetus
†Coptosipho
†Coptostoma
†Coptostomella
†Coraeophos
†Coralliophila
†Cordieria
†Cordispira
†Coriandria
†Cornulina
†Coronatica
†Coronia
†Coroniopsis
†Coroniscala
†Coronopsis
†Corsania
†Cortinella
†Cosmasyrinx
†Cosmetalepas
†Cosmocerithium
†Cosmolithes
†Cosmophiline
†Cossmannea
†Cossmannia
†Cossmannica
†Costaella
 Costellaria
†Costoanachis
†Costosyrnola
†Cotonopsis
†Cottonia
†Couthouyia
†Cowlitzia
†Craginia
†Cranopsis
†Craspedostoma
†Crassilabrum
†Crassimarginata
†Crassimurex
†Crassiscala
 Crassispira
†Crassispirella
†Crassopleura
†Crawfordina
†Crebriscala
†Cremides
†Crenaturricula
†Crenetocerithium
†Crenilabium
†Crenilunula
†Crenistriella
†Crenisutura
†Creniturbo
†Crenulazone
†Creonella
†Crepidula
†Crepipatella
†Creseis
†Cretaceomurex
†Cribraria
†Crimella
†Crisposcala
†Cristalloella
†Crommium
†Cronia
†Crossata
†Crossea
†Crosseola
†Crossoceras
†Crossostoma
†Crossotrema
 Crucibulum
†Cruziturricula
†Cryoturris
†Cryptaulax
†Cryptoborsonia
†Cryptobranchia
†Cryptochorda
†Cryptoconus
†Cryptocordieria
†Cryptomella
†Cryptonatica
†Cryptonerita
†Cryptoplocus
†Cryptoptyxis
†Cryptorhytis
†Cryptospira
†Ctenilyria
†Ctenocolpus
†Cubestana
†Culmia
†Cupaniella
†Cuphosolenus
†Cuphotifer
†Cupidoliva
†Curetia
†Cuvierina
†Cyclites
†Cyclobathmus
†Cyclodostomia
†Cyclomolops
†Cyclonema
†Cyclope
†Cycloscala
†Cycloscena
†Cyclospongia
†Cyclostomaria
†Cyclostrema
†Cyclostremela
 Cyclostremiscus
†Cyclostromella
†Cyclotheca
†Cyclothyca
†Cycloturbo
†Cyclozyga
Cylichna
†Cylichnania
†Cylichnatys
  Cylichnella
†Cylichnina
†Cylichnopsis
†Cylicioscapha
†Cylinder
†Cylindriscala
†Cylindritella
†Cylindrites
†Cylindritopsis
†Cylindrobullina
†Cylindromitra
†Cylindrotruncatum
†Cyllene
†Cyllenina
†Cymakra
†Cymatiella
 Cymatium
†Cymatophos
†Cymatospira
†Cymatosyrinx
 Cymbiola
†Cymbium
†Cymbularia
†Cymenorhytis
†Cymia
†Cynisca
†Cyniscella
 Cyphoma
†Cyphonochelus
 Cypraea
 Cypraecassis
†Cypraedia
†Cypraeerato
†Cypraeogemmula
†Cypraeopsis
†Cypraeorbis
†Cypraeotrivia
†Cyproglobina
†Cypropterina
†Cyrbasia
†Cyrtochetus
†Cyrtospira
†Cyrtostropha
†Cyrtulotibia
†Cythara
†Cytharella

D

†Dactylidella
†Dactylidia
†Daidia
†Dalliella
†Dallitesta
†Damesia
 Daphnella
†Daphnobela
†Darbya
†Dardanula
†Daronia
†Dasyostoma
†Decorospira
†Deianira
†Delphinulopsis
†Dembabaspira
†Demoulia
†Denayella
†Dendroconus
†Dennantia
†Dentallopoma
 Dentimargo
†Dentiscala
†Dentistyla
†Dentiterebra
†Dentrimitra
 Depressiscala
 Dermomurex
†Derstolida
†Dertonia
†Desertospira
†Deshayesia
†Deslongchampsia
†Desorinassa
†Deussenia
†Devonozyga
†Diacria
†Diaerecallus
 Diala
†Dialopsis
†Dialytostoma
†Diameza
 Diaphana
†Diarthema
 Diastoma
†Diastomella
†Diatinostoma
†Diatrypesis
†Dibaphimitra
†Dibaphus
†Dicellonema
†Dichostasia
†Dickinsiella
†Diconomorpha
†Dicosmos
†Dicroloma
†Dictyobembix
†Dictyotomaria
†Didianema
†Diempterus
†Dientomochilus
†Dietrichiella
†Digitolabrum
†Dihelice
†Dilatilabrum
 Diloma
†Diminovula
†Dimorphotectus
†Dinaxis
 Diodora
†Diplochilus
†Diploconula
†Diplocyma
†Diplomeriza
†Diplomitra
†Diplozone
†Diptychochilus
†Diptyxiella
†Dirachis
†Dircella
†Dirhachopea
†Dirocerithium
†Discobasis
†Discocirris
†Discogenus
†Discogonius
†Discohelix
†Discopsis
†Discordichilus
†Discoscala
†Discotectonica
†Discotectus
†Discotheca
†Discotoma
†Discotomaria
†Discotropis
†Disculus
†Disoketa
†Dispotaea
†Dissochilus
 Distorsio
†Ditretus
†Dizoniopsis
†Docomphala
†Doellocosmia
 Dolabella
†Dolicholatirus
†Dolichupis
†Dolicrassea
†Doliella
†Doliocassis
†Dolomena
†Dolomitella
†Dolostoma
†Domerginella
†Donaldiella
†Donaldina
†Dongiovannia
†Dorsanum
†Dorsina
†Dostia
†Douvilleia
†Douvilletoma
†Doxander
†Drepanocheilus
†Drepanoconcho
 Drillia
†Drilliola
†Drilluta
†Druidwilsonia
 Drupa
†Dumasella
†Dunkeria
 Duplicaria
†Dutrochus
†Dyeria

E

 Eatoniella
†Ebala
†Eburna
†Eburnopsis
†Eccliseogyra
†Ecculiomphalus
†Eccyliopterus
†Echinellopsis
†Echinimathilda
†Echininus
†Echinobathra
†Echinocirrus
†Echinofulgur
†Echinophoria
†Echinoturris
†Ecphora
†Ecphorosycon
†Ectinochilus
†Ectomaria
†Edithais
†Egerea
†Egestas
†Egilina
†Eglisia
†Egotistica
†Ehlersina
†Eichwaldiella
†Eirlysia
†Eiselia
 Elachorbis
†Elaeocyma
†Elasmonema
†Elatioriella
†Eleganella
†Elegantiscala
 Elephantanellum
†Eleutherospira
†Eligmoloxus
†Ellatrivia
†Ellicea
†Ellipsoscapha
†Elliptovermetus
†Ellisella
†Elysiacea
 Emarginula
†Emarginulina
†Emersonia
†Enaeta
†Enantiostoma
†Enatimene
†Enclyclomphalus
†Endianaulax
†Endiaplocus
†Endiataenia
†Endiatoma
†Endiatrachelus
†Endopachychilus
†Endoptygma
 Engina
 Engoniophos
†Enida
†Entacanthus
 Entemnotrochus
†Entomella
†Entomope
†Eoacteon
†Eoatlanta
†Eobucania
†Eocalliostoma
†Eocerithium
†Eocernina
†Eocithara
†Eoclathurella
†Eocymatium
†Eocypraea
†Eocythara
†Eodrilla
†Eoharpa
†Eoliotina
†Eomathilda
†Eopleurotoma
†Eoptychia
†Eoranella
†Eosinica
†Eosipho
†Eosiphonalia
†Eosolariella
†Eosolarium
†Eosurcula
†Eothesbia
†Eotomaria
†Eotrivia
†Eotrochactaeon
†Eotrochus
†Eoturris
†Eotympanotonus
†Eovasum
†Eovolutilithes
†Eovolva
†Eoxancus
†Epalxis
†Epetrium
†Epheria
†Epideira
†Epidirella
†Epidirona
†Epifaxis
†Epiptychia
†Episcynia
Epitonium
†Epulotrochus
 Erato
 Eratoidea
†Eratopsis
†Eratotrivia
†Erginus
†Ericusa
†Eripachya
†Eriptycha
 Erosaria
†Erronea
†Erymarella
†Escoffieria
†Estea
†Ethalia
†Etrema
†Etremopsis
†Euactaeonina
†Eubela
†Eucheilodon
 Euchelus
†Euchilotheca
†Euchrysalis
†Euclathurella
†Euclia
†Eucochlis
†Eucominia
†Euconactaeon
†Euconia
†Euconospira
†Eucycloidea
†Eucyclomphalus
†Eucycloscala
†Eucyclus
†Eucymba
†Eucypraedia
 Eudolium
†Eugabrielona
 Eulima
 Eulimastoma
†Eulimella
†Eulimene
†Eumetadrillia
†Eumetula
†Eumitra
†Eunaticina
†Eunema
†Eunemopsis
†Euninella
†Euomphalopsis
†Euomphalopterus
†Euomphalus
 Euparthenia
†Euphemitella
†Euphemites
†Euphemitopsis
†Euphyllon
 Eupleura
†Euplica
†Euprotomus
†Euriclanculus
†Eurissolina
†Euryalox
†Eurydike
†Euryentmema
†Euryentome
†Euryochetus
†Eurypyrene
†Eurytorus
†Euryzone
†Euscobinella
†Euseila
 Euspira
†Euspirocrommium
†Eustoma
†Eustomia
†Eustrombus
†Euthria
†Euthriofusus
†Euthymella
†Euthyrachis
†Euthystylus
†Eutinochilus
†Euzone
†Evalea
†Evarnula
†Evelynella
†Ewekoroia
†Ewekorolaxis
†Exechestoma
†Exechocirsus
†Exilia
†Exilifusus
†Exiloidea
†Exlessia
†Exomiliopsis
†Extendilabrum
†Eymarella

F

†Fadaiella
†Faloriella
†Falsicolus
†Falsifusus
†Falsostyliola
†Falsostyliola
†Faluniella
 Fartulum
 Fasciolaria
†Fascioplex
†Fascivelvata
†Fastigiella
Fautor
 Favartia
†Favria
†Favriella
†Fax
†Faxxia
†Feneoniana
†Fenestrosyrinx
†Fenolignum
†Fibula
†Fibulella
†Fibuloptygmatis
†Fibuloptyxis
†Ficopsis
†Fictoacteon
†Fictonoba
†Ficulomorpha
†Ficulopsis
 Ficus
†Filodrilla
†Fimbriatella
†Finlayola
†Fischeriella
 Fissurella
†Fissurellidea
†Fissurisepta
†Flacilla
†Flemmingia
†Fletcherviewia
†Flexopteron
†Floribella
†Floripatella
†Floyda
†Folina
†Foratiscala
 Forreria
†Forsia
†Forskaelena
†Fossacypraea
†Fossariopsis
 Fossarius
†Fossatrivia
†Fredenia
†Friginatica
†Frombachia
†Fujispira
†Fulgerca
 Fulgoraria
†Fulguroficus
†Fulgurofusus
†Funis
 Funiscala
†Fuscibuccinum
†Fuscoscala
†Fusiaphera
†Fusiguraleus
†Fusimilis
†Fusimitra
 Fusinus
†Fusiptyxis
†Fusispira
†Fusitoma
 Fusitriton
†Fusitron
†Fusiturricula
†Fusiturris
†Fusoficula
†Fusoidella
†Fusoterebra
†Fusus
†Futhystylus
†Fyfea

G

†Gabrielona
†Galeodaria
†Galeodea
†Galeodina
†Galeodinopsis
†Galeoocorys
†Galericulus
†Galeropsis
†Gamizyga
†Gammadiscus
†Gamopleura
†Ganesa
†Gargania
†Garnotia
†Garramites
†Gasconadia
†Gazameda
†Gegania
†Gelagna
†Gelasinostoma
†Gemaspira
†Gemmaterebra
†Gemmellaroia
†Gemmoliva
†Gemmula
†Gemmuloborsonia
†Genkaimurex
†Genota
†Geolcomia
†Georgia
†Gergovia
 Gibberula
†Gibberulina
†Gibberulus
 Gibbula
†Gigantocapulus
†Gigantocypraea
†Gigantogonia
†Gilbertina
†Gilbertturricula
†Ginebis
†Girtyspira
†Girvania
†Gisortia
†Gispyrella
†Glabella
†Glabrocingulum
†Glaphyrina
†Glauconia
†Glauconiella
†Globiconcha
†Globiomorpha
†Globisinum
†Globodrillia
†Globonema
†Globozygia
†Globularia
†Globulocerithium
†Glosia
†Glossaulax
†Glyphodeta
†Glyphostoma
†Glyphoturris
†Glyptochrysalis
†Glyptomaria
†Glyptospira
†Glyptostyla
†Glyptotoma
†Glyptozaria
†Gomphopages
†Goniasma
†Goniatogyra
†Goniocheila
†Gonioconcha
†Goniocylichna
†Goniocylindrites
†Goniodostomia
†Goniogyra
†Gonioptyxis
†Goniospira
†Gonysycon
†Gonzagia
†Gosavia
†Gosseletina
†Gothicispira
†Gouetina
†Gougerotia
†Gourmya
†Graciliala
†Gracilipurpura
†Gracilispira
†Gradiella
†Grandostoma
†Granosolarium
†Grantlandispira
†Granula
 Granulina
†Granulittorina
†Granulolabium
†Graphidula
†Graphiocomassa
†Graphis
†Gregorioiscala
†Groomodiscus
†Guelphinacella
†Guidonia
†Guildfordia
†Guizhouia
†Guizospira
†Gumina
†Guraleus
†Gutturnium
†Gymnarus
†Gymnentome
†Gymnocerithium
†Gyrineum
†Gyrodes
†Gyrodoma
†Gyroma
†Gyronema
 Gyroscala
†Gyrospira
†Gyrotropis

H

†Hacobjania
†Hadriania
†Hahazimania
†Halia
†Haliotiomorpha
 Haliotis
†Haliphoebus
 Halistylus
†Halloysia
†Hallstadtia
†Haloginella
 Haminoea
†Hamlinia
†Hammatospira
†Hamptoniella
†Hamusina
†Hanaibursa
†Hanaispira
†Hanetia
†Hapalorbis
†Haplocochlias
†Haploptyxis
†Haplospira
†Haplovoluta
†Harfordia
†Harmatia
†Harmeria
 Harpa
†Harpago
†Harpagodes
†Harpella
†Harpula
†Harrisianella
†Hartungia
 Hastula
†Haurakia
†Haustator
 Haustellum
†Hautura
†Hayamiella
†Haydenia
†Hebeseila
†Hebra
†Heida
†Heilprinia
 Helcion
 Heliacus
†Helicacanthus
†Helicaulax
†Helicocryptus
†Helicospira
†Helicotoma
†Heligmope
†Heligmostylus
†Heligmotenia
†Heligmotoma
†Helminthozyga
†Hemiacirsa
†Hemicerithium
†Hemichenopus
†Hemiconus
†Hemifusus
†Hemipleurotoma
†Hemiplicatula
†Hemisurcula
 Hemitoma
†Hemizyga
†Heniastoma
†Hennocquia
†Hercorhynchus
†Hermania
†Herminespina
Herpetopoma
 Hespererato
†Hesperiella
†Hesperiturris
†Hesperocirrus
†Heterocerithiopsis
†Heterocithara
†Heterogyrella
†Heteronodosus
†Heteroptygmatis
†Heterospira
†Heterotrema
†Hexachorda
†Hexaglauconia
 Hexaplex
†Hilda
†Hillites
†Hima
†Himantonia
†Hinia
†Hippocampoides
†Hippochrene
Hipponix
†Hiromurex
†Hirotyphis
†Hirsonella
†Hirtoscala
†Hispanosinuites
†Hispidofusus
†Hiwia
†Hologyra
†Holopea
†Holzapfelia
 Homalopoma
†Hopkinsiana
†Hordeulima
†Horiostomella
†Horizostoma
†Hormotoma
†Hormotomina
†Horologium
†Houdasia
†Houzeauia
†Hudlestonella
†Humiliworthenia
†Hungariella
†Hwaania
†Hyala
 Hyalina
†Hyalocylis
†Hyalorisia
†Hyaloscala
†Hybochelus
†Hydrotribulus
†Hyperacanthus
†Hypergonia
†Hyphantozyga
†Hypocassis
†Hypodema
†Hypselentoma
†Hypsipleura
†Hypterita
†Hystricoceras
†Hystrivasum

I

†Ianthinopsis
†Iddingsia
†Idioraphe
†Ihungia
†Ilanga
†Iljinella
 Illyanassa
†Imbricaria
†Incilaster
†Incisilabium
†Indocerithium
†Indovoluta
†Infracoronia
†Infundibulops
†Inglisella
†Inquisitor
†Insolentia
†Involuta
†Iolaea
†Iothia
†Iphiana
†Iravadia
 Iredalina
Iredalula
†Isanda
†Ischnoptygma
 Iselica
†Isfarispira
†Ishnula
†Islipia
†Isonema
†Isospira
†Ispharina
†Isselia
†Italoptygmatis
†Ithycythara
†Itia
†Itieria
†Itomelania
†Itruvia
†Ivara
†Ividella

J

†Jaccardiella
†Janacus
†Janiopsis
 Janthina
†Japelion
†Jaton
†Jedria
†Jeffreysina
 Jenneria
†Jetwoodsia
†Jogjacartanus
†Johannaia
†Johnstrupia
†Josepha
†Jousseemea
 Jujubinus
 Julia
†Jumala
†Junghuhnia
†Jurassiphorus

K

†Kaawatina
†Kahua
†Kaiparapelta
†Kaitangata
†Kaitoa
†Kangapaya
†Kangilioptera
†Kangxianospira
†Kapua
†Katoptychia
†Katosira
†Kaunhowenia
†Kaurnella
†Kawanamia
†Kaweka
†Keeneia
†Keepingia
†Keilostoma
 Kelletia
†Keration
†Kestocenbra
†Khetella
†Khumerspira
†Kiaeromphalus
†Kimina
†Kinishbia
†Kinkaidia
†Kishinewia
†Kittlia
†Kittliconcha
†Kittlidiscus
†Kittlistylus
†Kittlitrochus
†Kiviasukkaan
†Kjerulfonema
†Kleinacteon
 Knefastia
†Knightella
†Knightites
†Kodymites
†Kokenella
†Kokenospira
†Koniakaua
†Korovinia
†Kotakaia
†Krachia
†Krebsia
†Kuroshioturris
 Kurtziella
†Kyndalyna

L

†Labiostrombus
†Labridens
†Labrocuspis
†Laccinum
†Lachryma
†Lacinia
†Lacriforma
 Lacuna
†Lacunaria
†Lacunella
†Lacunina
†Lacunospira
†Lacurnaria
†Ladinotrochus
†Ladinula
†Laetifautor
†Laevella
†Laevibaculus
†Laevibuccinum
†Laeviconulus
†Laevihastula
†Laevinerinea
†Laeviselica
†Laevistrombus
†Laeviterebrum
†Laevitomaria
†Laevityphis
†Lagunitus
†Laiocochlis
 Lambis
 Lamellaria
†Lamelliphorus
†Lamellospira
†Lampanella
†Lampasopsis
†Lamprodoma
†Lamprodomina
†Lampusia
†Lancedellia
†Lapparia
†Lathyrulus
†Latiala
 Latiaxis
†Latifusus
†Latirolagena
 Latirus
†Latisipho
†Latitaenia
†Laubella
†Lautoconus
†Laxispira
†Leaella
†Lecanospira
†Leiopyrga
†Leiorhinus
†Leiostraca
†Leiotrochus
†Lemintina
†Lemniscolittorina
†Lenitrophon
†Lenticularis
†Lentigo
 Lepeta
†Lepetella
†Lepetopsis
†Lepicythara
†Lepidotrochus
†Leporemax
†Leporicypraea
Lepsiella
†Lepsithais
†Leptadrillia
†Leptegauana
†Leptocolpus
†Leptoconus
†Leptomaria
†Leptomphalus
†Leptomurex
†Leptoptygma
†Leptorima
†Leptoscapha
†Leptosurcula
†Leptothyra
†Leptothyropsis
†Leptozone
†Leptozyga
†Lesperonia
†Lesueurilla
†Leucorhynchia
 Leucosyrinx
 Leucozonia
†Leufroyia
†Levella
†Levenia
†Leviathania
†Levifusus
†Lewinskia
†Lewisiella
†Liaohenia
†Libycerithium
†Lienardia
†Ligatella
†Lilax
†Liljevallospira
Liloa
Limacina
†Limneria
Limulatys
†Linatella
†Linemera
†Linglingella
†Liniaxis
†Linopyrga
†Linsleyella
†Liocarenus
†Liocerithium
†Liochlamys
†Liocium
†Lioglyphostoma
†Liomesus
†Liopeplum
†Liospira
†Liotella
 Liotia
†Liotina
†Lippistes
†Liracassis
†Liracraea
†Lirastrombina
†Lirasyrinx
†Liratilia
†Liratomina
†Lirobittium
†Lirocingula
†Lirofusus
†Lironoba
†Lirosoma
†Lirularia
†Lisbonia
†Lischkeia
†Lispodesthes
†Lissapiopsis
†Lissochilus
†Lissomuricopsis
†Lissospira
 Lissotesta
 Lissotestella
†Lithoconus
†Lithophysema
 Lithopoma
†Lithotrochus
 Litiopa
 Littoraria
 Littorina
†Littorinides
†Littorinolacuna
†Littorinopsis
†Littorniscala
 Livonia
†Lodanaria
 Lodderena
†Lodderia
†Lomia
†Lomirosa
†Longchaeus
†Longicerithium
†Longoconcha
†Longstaffia
†Lophioturris
†Lophocochlias
†Lophonema
†Lophospira
 Lottia
†Lowenstamia
†Loxisonia
†Loxobidens
†Loxonema
†Loxoplocus
†Loxoptyxis
†Loxotaphrus
 Lucapina
 Lucapinella
†Lucerapex
†Lucidestea
†Luciella
†Luciellina
 Lunatia
 Lunatica
†Lunella
†Lunulazona
†Lupira
†Luponovula
†Luria
†Lutema
†Lutima
†Lydiphnis
†Lyncina
†Lyosoma
†Lyria
†Lyrianella
†Lyrischapa
†Lyromangelia
†Lyropurpura
†Lyrosurcula
†Lyrotyphis
†Lysiogyrus
†Lysis
†Lytospira

M

†Macilentos
†Macluritella
†Maclurites
 Macrocypraea
†Macrodostomia
†Macromphalus
 Macron
†Macroniscus
†Macrosinus
†Macrozafra
†Macrurella
†Madiella
 Magilus
†Magnatica
†Magnicapulus
†Makiyamaia
†Malayaspira
 Malea
†Malluvium
†Mambrinia
†Mamiconus
†Mammilla
†Manawatawhia
†Mancorus
†Mandolina
 Mangelia
†Mangiliella
†Manzanospira
†Manzonia
Maoricolpus
†Maoricrypta
†Maoriscaphander
†Maoritomella
†Maorivetia
†Marbodeia
 Marevalvata
Margarella
†Margaritella
 Margarites
 Marginella
†Margineulima
†Mariacassia
†Mariacolpus
†Mariadrillia
†Mariafusus
†Marianarona
†Mariasalpinx
†Mariasveltia
†Mariaturricula
†Marinauris
†Mariothia
†Mariottia
†Marmarostoma
†Marmolatella
†Marshallaria
†Marshallena
†Marsupina
†Marticia
†Marwickara
†Massyla
†Mastigospira
†Mataxa
Mathilda
†Mathurifusus
†Maudrillia
†Mauithoe
†Maurea
†Mauria
†Mauritia
†Mauryna
†Maussenetia
 Maxwellia
†Mayeria
†Mazzalina
†Meandrella
†Mecoliotia
†Mediargo
†Medionapus
†Medoriopsis
†Meekospira
†Megalatractus
†Megalocypraea
†Megalomphala
†Megalomphalus
†Megalonoda
†Megastomia
†Megasurcula
†Megatebennus
 Megathura
†Megistostoma
 Meioceras
†Melagraphia
Melanatria
 Melanella
†Melanioptyxis
†Melapium
†Melaraphe
†Melatoma
†Mellarium
†Mellevillia
Melongena
†Menestho
†Mennessieria
†Menthafonia
†Merelina
†Merica
†Mericella
†Merriamites
†Mesalia
†Mesochilotoma
†Mesocoelia
†Mesogena
†Mesoglauconia
†Mesohalina
†Mesoneritina
†Mesorhytis
†Mesospira
†Mesotrochactaeon
†Mesovalvata
†Metacerithium
†Metaconulus
†Metamelon
 Metaxia
†Metoptoma
†Metorthonema
†Metriomphalus
†Metula
†Metulella
†Mexicotrochaetaeon
†Micantapex
†Michaletia
†Michela
†Michelia
†Micheliopsis
†Micraclathurella
†Micranellium
Micrelenchus
†Micrentoma
†Micreschara
†Microcheilus
†Microdoma
†Microdrillia
†Microfulgur
†Microfusus
†Microgaza
†Microlacuna
†Microliotia
†Micromphalina
†Micromphalus
†Microptychis
†Microrhytis
†Microschiza
†Microstelma
†Microsurcula
†Microtaphrus
†Microthyca
†Microvoluta
†Mikadotrochus
†Milda
†Millepes
†Millosevichia
†Minolia
†Minutiscala
†Mioawateria
†Miocenebra
†Miofractarmilla
†Miolyncina
†Miomelon
†Miopila
†Miopleiona
†Mirachelus
†Miraclathurella
†Miralda
†Mirascapha
†Mirlolaminatus
†Mirochiliticus
†Mirua
†Mirula
†Misteia
†Mistostigma
 Mitra
†Mitraria
†Mitratoma
 Mitrella
†Mitrelloturris
†Mitreola
†Mitridomus
†Mitrithara
†Mitrodrillia
†Mitrolumna
 Mitromorpha
†Mnestia
†Mnestocylichnella
†Modelia
†Modestospira
 Modulus
†Moelleria
†Moerckeia
†Molopophorus
†Monalaria
†Monetaria
†Monilea
†Moniliopsis
†Moniliriretusa
†Monocirsus
†Monocuphus
†Monodentella
†Monodilepas
 Monodonta
†Monoplex
†Monopophorus
†Monoptygma
†Montfortia
†Montfortula
†Montia
†Montospira
†Morania
†Morchiella
†Morea
†Morgania
†Morionella
†Mormula
†Morphotropis
 Morula
 Morum
†Morunella
†Motyris
†Mourlonia
†Mourlonopsis
†Mrhilaia
†Muconalia
†Multifarites
†Multiptyxis
 Munditia
†Munditiella
†Murchisonella
†Murchisonia (Gastropod)
†Muregina
 Murex
 Murexiella
†Murexsul
 Muricanthus
†Muricassis
 Muricopsis
†Muricotrochus
†Murotriton
†Murphitys
†Musashia
†Myagrostoma
†Myobarbum
†Myristica
†Myurella
†Myurellina

N

†Nacca
Nacella
†Nairiella
†Nanggulania
†Nannamoria
†Nannodiella
†Nannopyrgula
†Nannubasa
†Napulus
†Naquetia
†Naricava
†Naricopsina
†Narona
†Nassa
†Nassaria
†Nassarina
Nassarius
†Nassicola
†Natella
†Natica
†Naticarius
†Naticonema
†Naticopsis
†Natiria
†Natitaria
†Nawenia
†Neamphitomaria
†Nebularia
†Neilsonia
†Nekewis
†Nematrochus
†Nemrac
†Neoathleta
†Neobernaya
†Neocola
†Neocylindrites
†Neocylindrus
†Neoguraleus
†Neoimbricaria
†Neojanacus
†Neolatirus
†Neonerinea
†Neoplatytaichum
†Neopleurofusia
†Neoptyxis
†Neosimnia
†Neotrochaetaeon
†Neozeba
†Nepotilla
†Neptunea
†Nereina
†Neridomus
†Nerinatica
†Nerinea
†Nerinella
†Nerineopsis
†Nerineoptyxis
†Nerinoides
†Nerita
†Neritaria
Neritina
†Neritoma
†Neritoplica
†Neritopsis
†Neritoptyx
†Neritrema
†Nevadaspira
†Neverita
†Nicema
†Nicolia
†Nicosiaella
†Nigerapana
†Nigerithium
†Nihonia
†Nina
†Ninella
†Niotha
†Nipponitys
†Nipteraxis
†Nisaclis
†Nisiturris
†Niso
†Nisostomia
†Nitidella
†Nitidiscala
†Niveria
†Nodilittorina
Nodiscala
†Nodisurculina
†Noditerebra
†Nododelphinula
†Nodonema
†Nodospira
†Nodulus
†Noetca
†Nonacteonina
†Nordospira
†Norrisella
†Norrisia
†Northia
†Notacirsa
†Notadusta
Notoacmea
Notocrater
†Notocypraea
†Notocytharella
†Notogenota
†Notohaliotis
†Notoluponia
†Notomella
†Notopeplum
†Notoplejona
†Notoscrobs
†Notoseila
†Notosetia
†Notosinister
†Nototrivia
†Notovoluta
†Nozeba
Nucella
†Nuclearia
†Nucleopsis
†Nudangarita
†Nudivagus
†Nummocalcar
†Nummotectus

O

†Oamaruia
†Obex
†Obexomia
†Obornella
 Obtortio
†Obtusella
 Ocenebra
†Ochetochilus
†Ochetoclava
†Ocinebrellus
†Ocinebrina
†Odetta
†Odoardia
†Odontobasis
†Odontofusus
†Odontomaria
†Odontopolys
†Odontopurpura
†Odontoturbo
†Odostomella
 Odostomia
†Odostomidea
†Oehlertia
 Oenopota
†Offleya
†Offlyeotrochus
†Ogivia
†Okinawavoluta
†Olequahia
†Oligoptycha
†Oligoptyxis
 Oliva
†Olivancillaria
 Olivella
†Olivia
†Olivula
†Olssonella
†Omalaxis
 Omalogyra
†Omanimaria
†Omogymna
†Omospira
†Omphalius
†Omphalonema
†Omphaloptycha
†Omphalotrochus
Omphalotropis
†Oncochilus
†Ongleya
†Oniscidia
†Onkospira
†Onoba
 Oocorys
†Ooliticia
†Oonia
†Oostrombus
†Ootomaria
†Ootomella
 Opalia
†Opaliopsis
†Opella
†Ophileta
†Ophiletina
 Ophiodermella
†Opimilda
†Opisthonema
†Optoturris
 Orbitestella
†Orecopia
†Orectospira
†Orinella
†Ormastralium
†Ornamentaria
†Ornatoptygmatis
†Ornatospira
†Ornopsis
†Orospira
†Orthaulax
†Orthochetus
†Orthochilus
†Orthonema
†Orthonychia
†Orthoptyxis
†Orthostomia
†Orthosurcula
†Osilinus
†Ossiania
†Ostioma
†Otatara
†Otollonia
†Otomphalus
†Otopleura
†Otostoma
†Ottoino
Otukaia
†Ovactaeonina
†Ovatipsa
†Ovilia
†Ovinotis
†Ovirissoa
†Ovulactaeon
†Ovulopsis
†Owenella
†Oxyacrum
†Oxycypraea
†Oxygyrus
†Oxymeris
†Oxyspira
†Oxystele
†Ozarkina
†Ozarkispira
†Ozodochilus

P

†Pachycrommium
†Pachycymbiola
†Pachycythara
†Pachydontella
 Pachymelon
†Pachyomphalus
†Pachyrissoina
†Pachystrophia
†Pachysyrnola
†Pagodea
†Pagodina
†Pagodospira
†Pagodula
†Pakistania
†Paladmete
†Palaeatractus
†Palaeocancellaria
†Palaeocollonia
†Palaeocypraea
†Palaeohydatina
†Palaeoloxotoma
†Palaeonarica
†Palaeonisco
†Palaeopsephaea
†Palaeorhaphis
†Palaeoschisma
†Palaeoscurria
†Palaeostylus
†Palaeotrochactaeon
†Palaeotrochus
†Palaeozygopleura
†Palangaria
†Paleoalvania
†Paleofusimitra
†Paleunema
†Paleuphemites
†Pallacera
†Palliocypraea
†Palliseria
†Palmadusta
†Palomelon
†Panamurex
†Pangoa
†Panormella
†Papillina
†Paraborsonia
†Paracerithium
†Paracirculus
†Paraclathurella
†Paracomitas
†Paracomminia
†Paradrilla
†Parafusus
†Paraglauconia
†Paragoniozona
†Paraliospira
†Paramarshallena
 Parametaria
†Paramorea
†Paranassa
†Paraneistrolepis
†Parangarenga
†Parangularia
†Paraplatyschisma
†Parapuractaeon
†Pararaphispira
†Paraseraphs
†Parasimplotyxis
†Parasyngenochilus
†Parasyrinx
†Parataphrus
†Paraterebra
†Paratrophon
†Paraturbo
†Paraviviana
†Parazebinella
†Pareora
†Pareuchelus
†Pareuryalox
†Parietiplicatum
†Parinotus
†Paronaella
†Parthenina
†Partubiola
†Partulida
†Parvacmea
†Parvimitra
†Parvirota
†Parviscala
†Parvisetia
†Parvisipho
†Parviviana
†Parvivoluta
†Pasitheola
 Patella
†Patellastra
†Patellilabia
 Patelloida
†Patellopsis
†Patellostium
†Patuxentrophon
†Paulonaria
†Pavora
†Paxula
†Payradeautia
†Paziella
†Pchelincevella
†Peasiella
†Pectinodonta
†Peculator
†Pedasiola
Pedicularia
 Pedipes
†Peelerophon
†Pegocomptus
†Pelicaria
†Pellasimnia
†Pellax
†Penion
†Pentagonodiscus
†Pentaptyxis
†Peonza
†Pepta
†Peracle
†Pereiraea
†Periaulax
†Pericarinata
†Peridipsaccus
†Peringiella
†Perissitys
†Perissodonta
†Perissolax
†Perissoptera
†Peristernia
†Peritrophon
†Pernericirrus
†Perneritrochus
†Perotrochus
†Perplicaria
†Perrinia
†Perrona
†Perse
 Persicula
†Personella
†Personopsis
†Perucerithium
†Peruchilus
†Peruficus
†Perulithes
†Peruluta
†Peruniscus
†Perustrombus
†Peruviella
†Peruvispira
†Pervicacia
 Petaloconchus
†Petersia
†Petrafixia
†Petropoma
†Peyrotia
†Pezantia
 Phalium
†Phandella
†Phanerolepida
†Phaneroptyxis
†Phanerotinus
†Phanerotrema
†Pharetrolites
†Pharkidonotus
 Phasianella
†Phasianema
†Phasianochilus
†Phasianotrochus
†Phenacovolva
Phenatoma
 Philine
†Philippia
†Philoxene
†Pholidotoma
†Phoracanthus
†Phorculus
†Phorcus
 Phos
†Phosinella
†Phragmolites
†Phragmosphaera
†Phrontis
†Phryx
†Phyllocheilus
†Phyllonotus
†Phymatopleura
†Pictavia
†Pictiformes
†Pictoscala
†Piestochilus
†Pietteia
†Pileolus
†Pinquigemmula
†Pirena
†Pirenella
†Pirgos
†Pirper
†Pirsila
†Pisanella
 Pisania
†Pisanianura
†Pisinna
†Pisulina
†Pithodea
†Pittella
†Plagiothyra
 Planaxis
†Planicollonia
†Planitrochus
†Planolateralus
†Planospirina
†Planotectus
†Planozone
†Planpyrgiscus
†Platyacra
†Platybassis
†Platyceras
†Platychilina
†Platyconcha
†Platyconus
†Platycythara
Platyla
†Platyloron
†Platyoptera
†Platyschisma
†Platyteichum
†Platyworthenia
†Platyzona
†Plectocion
†Plectonotoides
†Plectonotus
†Pleia
†Pleioptygma
†Plentaria
†Plesioacirsa
†Plesiocerithium
†Plesioptygmatis
†Plesiothyreus
†Plesiotriton
†Plesiotrochus
†Plethospira
†Pleuracme
†Pleuratella
†Pleurofusia
†Pleurolimnaea
†Pleuroliria
†Pleuromphalus
†Pleuronotus
 Pleuroploca
†Pleuropyramis
†Pleurorima
 Pleurotomaria
†Pleurotomella
†Pleurotomoides
†Plicafoliosa
†Plicarcularia
†Plicifusus
†Pliciscala
†Plicobulla
†Pliconacca
†Plocezyga
†Plochelaea
†Ploconema
†Plocostoma
†Plocostylus
†Plotophysops
 Poirieria
†Poleumita
†Polinella
 Polinices
†Poliniciella
 Pollia
†Polygyreulima
†Polygyrina
†Polystira
†Polytremaria
†Pomahakia
 Pomaulax
†Ponderia
†Ponocyclus
†Popenella
†Popenoeum
†Porcellia
†Pornosis
†Poropteron
†Portlockiella
†Portoricia
†Postalia
†Potamides
†Potamidopsis
†Powellisetia
†Praehyalocylis
†Praelittorina
†Praematuratropis
†Praenatica
†Praestomatia
†Preangeria
†Prestrombus
†Priene
 Primovula
†Prionovolva
†Priotrochus
†Priscaphander
†Priscoficus
†Priscofusus
†Prisogaster
†Pristimerica
†Pristinacca
†Proacirsa
†Proadusta
†Procalpurnus
†Procampanile
†Procancellaria
†Procerapex
†Procerithiopsis
†Procerithium
†Proclava
†Procominula
†Proconulus
†Prodiozoptyxis
†Proficus
†Profundialvania
†Progabbia
†Promartynia
†Promathilda
†Promourlonia
†Propemurchisonia
 Propilidium
†Propustularia
†Proscala
†Proscutum
†Prosimnia
†Prosipho
†Prosolarium
†Prosoptychus
†Prosthenodon
†Proterato
†Protoatlanta
†Protobarleeia
†Protobusycon
†Protocalyptaea
†Protocypraea
†Protocypraedia
†Protodolium
†Protofusus
†Protoma
†Protonema
†Protopirula
†Protorcula
†Protorotella
†Protospirialis
†Protostylifera
†Protostylus
†Protosurcula
†Prototurbo
†Prototyphis
†Protuba
†Proturboella
†Proturritella
†Provermicularia
†Proxicharonia
†Proximitra
†Proxiuber
 Prunum
†Psammodulus
†Psephaea
†Pseudalaria
†Pseudamaura
†Pseudaulicina
†Pseudavena
†Pseudoaclisina
†Pseudoaluco
†Pseudoaptyxis
†Pseudobaylea
†Pseudobrochidium
†Pseudobuccinum
†Pseudocancilla
†Pseudocassis
†Pseudochrysalis
†Pseudocirsope
†Pseudoclanculus
†Pseudocominella
†Pseudocryptaenia
†Pseudocymia
†Pseudodiartema
†Pseudodiloma
†Pseudofax
†Pseudofissurella
†Pseudofulgur
†Pseudofusia
†Pseudogaleodea
†Pseudoglauconia
†Pseudohercynella
†Pseudolacuna
†Pseudolatirus
†Pseudoliomesus
†Pseudoliotina
†Pseudoliva
†Pseudolyria
†Pseudomalaxis
†Pseudomelania
†Pseudomelatoma
†Pseudomesalia
†Pseudometula
†Pseudomorea
†Pseudompalotrochus
†Pseudomurchisonia
†Pseudoneptunea
†Pseudonerinea
†Pseudonina
†Pseudoninella
†Pseudoperissitys
†Pseudoperissolax
†Pseudophasianus
†Pseudophorus
†Pseudopisania
†Pseudoplatyceras
†Pseudoplocezyga
†Pseudorapa
†Pseudoraphitoma
†Pseudorhytidopilus
†Pseudorotella
†Pseudoscalites
†Pseudoscalites
†Pseudoschizogonium
†Pseudosetia
†Pseudostomatella
†Pseudotaphrus
†Pseudotectus
†Pseudotoma
†Pseudotorinia
†Pseudotritonium
†Pseudotrivia
†Pseudotruncatella
†Pseudotubina
†Pseudotylostoma
†Pseudovaricia
†Pseudovertagus
†Pseudowarthia
†Pseudozonaria
†Pseudozygopleura
†Psilarius
†Psilaxis
†Psilocochlis
†Ptereulima
†Pterocera
†Pterocerella
†Pterocheilos
†Pterochelus
†Pterodonta
†Pterodonticeras
†Pterolabrella
 Pteropurpura
†Pterorytis
†Pterospira
†Pterotheca
Pterotrachea
 Pterotyphis
†Pterygia
 Pterynotus
†Ptomatis
†Ptychatractus
†Ptycheulimella
†Ptychobellerophon
†Ptychocaulus
†Ptychocerithium
†Ptychocylindrites
†Ptychogyra
†Ptychomphalina
†Ptychomphalus
†Ptychopotamides
†Ptychoris
†Ptychosalpinx
†Ptychosphaera
†Ptychospirina
†Ptychostoma
†Ptychosyca
†Ptychosyrinx
†Ptychozone
†Ptygmatis
 Pugilina
†Pugnellus
†Puha
†Pulchrastele
†Pulchritima
 Punctiscala
†Punctospira
 Puncturella
†Puncturellopsis
†Punjabia
†Pupa
†Pupatonia
 Puperita
†Pupillaea
†Pupillaria
†Puposyrnola
 Purpura
†Purpuradusta
†Purpurellus
†Purpurina
†Purpuroidea
†Puruiana
†Puruninella
 Pusia
†Pusillina
†Pusiolina
†Pusionella
 Pustularia
†Pustulifer
 Pusulla
†Putilla
†Putzeysia
†Pycnomphalus
†Pycnotrochus
†Pyktes
 Pyramidella
†Pyramidelloides
†Pyramimitra
†Pyramistomia
†Pyramitoma
†Pyrazella
†Pyrazisinus
†Pyrazus
 Pyrene
†Pyrenomitra
†Pyrenoturris
†Pyrgiscilla
 Pyrgiscus
 Pyrgocythara
†Pyrgolampros
†Pyrgolidium
†Pyrgotrochus
†Pyrgulina
†Pyrifusus
†Pyropsis
†Pyruclia
†Pyrulofusus
†Pyrunculus
†Pythmenema
†Pyxipoma

Q

†Quadricarina
†Quadrinervus
†Quassisipho
†Quimalea
†Quoyia

R

†Rabicea
†Radinista
†Raha
†Raincourtia
†Ramina
 Ranella
†Ranellina
†Rangimata
†Ranularia
 Rapana
†Raphischisma
†Raphispira
†Raphistoma
†Raphistomina
†Raphitoma
†Rapopsis
†Ratifusus
†Raulinia
†Ravitrona
†Ravnostomia
†Rectiplanes
†Recurvina
†Redocla
†Remera
†Remnita
Renea
†Reticulacella
†Reticuloturris
†Retiopustula
†Retipirula
†Retispira
†Retizafra
 Retusa
†Reymentella
†Rhabdocolpus
†Rhabdoconcha
†Rhabdotocochlis
†Rhaphischisma
†Rhaphistomella
 Rhinoclavus
†Rhinoderma
†Rhizorus
†Rhombella
†Rhomboidestoma
†Rhombopsis
†Rhombostoma
†Rhopalites
†Rhynchocerithium
†Rhynchocypraea
†Rhytidopilus
†Ricinella
 Rictaxis
†Rigauxia
†Rimella
†Rimosodaphnella
 Rimula
†Rimulopsis
†Rinaldoconchus
†Rinaldomphalus
 Ringicula
†Ringiculella
†Ringiculina
†Ringiculocosta
†Ringiculopsis
†Ringiculoptycha
†Ringiculospongia
†Ringinella
†Ripleyella
†Risella
†Risellopsis
†Risselloidea
 Rissoa
†Rissocerithium
 Rissoina
†Rissolina
†Rissomangelia
†Rissopsetia
†Ritena
†Riuguhdrillia
†Robus
†Rochia
†Rolandomphalus
†Rollandiana
 Roperia
†Rossiteria
†Rostellaca
†Rostellana
†Rostellaria
†Rostellinda
†Rostreulima
†Rostrocerithium
†Rotadiscoides
†Rothpeltzia
†Rothpletzella
†Rousseauspira
†Roxania
†Roxaniella
 Roya
†Ruedemannia
†Rufilla
†Rugatiscala
†Rugiferia
†Rugobela
†Rugotyphis
†Rugulina
†Rumerloella

S

†Sabatia
†Sabaziella
†Sabia
†Sabinella
†Sablea
†Sabrinella
†Saccaroturris
†Saccoina
†Sagenella
†Sallya
†Salpingostoma
†Salterospira
†Sandbergeria
†Sanhaliotis
†Santia
†Sargana
†Sarmates
†Sarmaticus
†Sarmaturbo
†Sassia
†Scabrella
†Scabricola
†Scaevola
†Scalaetrochus
 Scalaria
†Scalaronoba
†Scalaspira
†Scalenostoma
†Scalina
†Scaliola
†Scalites
†Scalitina
†Scalituba
†Scalptia
 Scaphander
 Scaphella
†Scaphellopsis
†Sceptrum
†Schilderia
†Schizobasis
†Schizogonium
†Schizolopha
†Schizopea
 Schwartziella
 Scissurella
 Scissurona
†Scobinella
†Scobinodola
†Scoliostoma
 Sconsia
†Scorbinidola
†Scrinium
†Scrobs
†Scrupus
†Sculpturea
†Scurriopsis
†Scutellastra
 Scutus
†Searlesia
†Sediliopsis
†Seelya
†Seguenzia
 Seila
†Seisa
†Sellinema
†Semahana
†Semiactaeon
†Semibittium
 Semicassis
†Semicypraea
†Semineritina
†Seminola
†Semipirum
†Semisolarium
†Semistylifer
†Semiterebellum
†Semitriton
†Semitrivia
†Semitubina
†Semityphis
†Semivertagus
†Semperia
†Sentularia
 Septa
†Sequania
†Seraphs
†Serpentubina
 Serpulorbis
†Serpulospira
†Serrata
†Serratifusus
†Serratocerithium
†Serratotrochus
†Serrifusus
†Settsassia
†Sevanella
†Seymourosphaera
†Shansiella
†Shikamacirrus
†Shikokuspira
†Shwedagonia
Sigapatella
†Sigaretopsis
†Sigaretotrema
 Sigatica
†Sigmesalia
 Siliquaria
†Siluracmaea
†Siluriphorus
 Simnia
†Sinaxila
†Sincola
 Sinezona
†Singulitubus
†Sinistrella
†Sinistrospira
†Sinorificium
†Sinospira
†Sinuella
†Sinuina
†Sinuites
†Sinuitina
 Sinum
†Sinuopea
†Sinuozyga
†Sinuspira
†Sinustomia
†Sinutropis
†Sinzowia
†Sipho
†Siphocypraea
†Siphonacmea
 Siphonalia
 Siphonaria
†Siphonochelus
†Siphonophyla
†Siphonorbis
†Siphopatella
†Siratus
†Sirius
†Sisenna
†Siskyouspira
†Skaptotion
†Skena
 Smaragdia
†Smithiellia
†Socotora
†Sogdianella
†Sohlella
†Sohlia
†Sohlitella
†Solariaxis
 Solariella
†Solarioconulus
†Solariorbis
†Solarium
†Solatia
†Soleniscus
†Solenosteira
†Sollariaxis
†Solutofusus
†Sorapisella
†Sororcula
†Sosiolytes
†Spanionema
†Sparella
Spectamen
Specula
†Speightia
†Spelaenacca
†Sphaerocina
†Sphaerocypraea
†Sphaeronassa
†Sphenosphaera
†Spinaspira
†Spineoterebra
†Spinicharybdis
†Spinigera
†Spiniscala
†Spinomelon
†Spinulrichospira
†Spiractaeon
†Spiraculinella
†Spiradaphne
†Spiralta
†Spirgvaleia
†Spirina
†Spirochrysalis
†Spirocirrus
†Spirocolpus
†Spirocrypta
†Spirocyclina
†Spirocyclus
†Spirodentalium
†Spiroecus
†Spirogalerus
†Spiroglyphus
 Spirolaxis
†Spiromphalus
†Spironema
†Spironemella
†Spiroscala
†Spirostylus
†Spirotomaria
†Spirotropis
 Splendrillia
†Spoelia
†Squamalinia
†Squarrosus
†Stachella
†Staffinia
†Stantonella
†Staphylaea
†Stazzania
†Stegocoelia
 Stellaria
†Stellaxis
†Stelzneria
†Stenoloron
 Stenorhytis
†
†Stenozone
†Stephanoconus
†Stephanocosmia
†Stephanosalpinx
†Stephanozyga
†Stereokion
†Steromphala
Sthenorytis
 Stigmaulax
 Stilifer
†Stilla
†Stiracolpus
 Stomatella
†Stomatia
†Stosicia
 Stramonita
†Strangulites
†Straparella
†Straparollina
†Straparollus
†Strebloceras
†Strephona
†Strephonella
†Strepsidura
†Streptacis
†Streptocarina
†Streptochetus
†Streptodictyon
†Streptodiscus
†Streptolathyrus
†Streptopelma
†Streptotrochus
†Striactaeonina
†Striatesta
†Striaticostatum
†Striatiscala
†Strictohumerus
†Strigatella
†Strigillibuccinum
†Strigosella
†Striocarinata
†Striodostomia
†Strioterebrum
†Strioturbonilla
†Strobeus
†Strombiformis
 Strombina
†Strombinella
†Strombinophos
†Stromboconus
†Strombolaria
†Strombopugnellus
 Strombus
†Strominella
†Strongylocera
†Strophostylus
†Strotostoma
†Struthiochenopus
†Struthiolarella
 Struthiolaria
†Struthiolariopsis
†Struthioptera
†Stuorella
†Sturgeonospira
†Stylidium
†Styliola
†Stylonema
†Styloplocus
†Suavodrillia
†Subcancilla
†Subclimax
†Subditotectarius
†Subninella
†Subpterynotus
†Subula
†Subuliscala
†Subulites
†Suchium
†Suessonia
†Sulcoactaeon
†Sulcocypraea
†Sulcogladius
†Sulconatica
†Sulcoretusa
†Sulcorinella
†Sulcosipho
†Sulcosubularia
†Sulcotrivia
†Sulcoturbonilla
†Sulculus
†Sundabittium
†Superstes
 Supplanaxis
†Suprazonalis
†Surcula
†Surculina
†Surculites
†Surculoma
†Sveltella
†Sveltia
†Swainsonia
†Sycodes
†Sycopsis
†Sycostoma
†Sycotypus
†Sydaphera
†Sylvestrosphaera
†Symmetrocapulus
 Synaptocochlea
†Syncera
†Syngenochelus
†Syntomodrillia
†Syrnola

T

†Tachyrhynchella
†Tachyrhynchus
†Taemasotrochus
†Taeniaturbo
†Taeniospira
†Tahudrilla
†Tahusyrinx
†Taieria
†Taioma
†Taita
†Takia
†Talahabia
†Talantodiscus
†Talityphis
Talopena
†Talostolida
 Talparia
†Tanaliopsis
†Tanea
†Taniella
†Tanimasanoria
†Tantunia
†Taosia
†Taphrostomia
†Tapinotomaria
†Taramellia
†Taranis
†Tarantinaea
†Taron
†Tatara
†Tateiwaia
†Taurasia
†Tauricella
†Tauschia
†Taxonia
†Tectaplica
†Tectariopsis
 Tectarius
†Tectifusus
 Tectonatica
†Tectospira
 Tectura
†Tectus
 Tegula
†Teiichispira
†Teilostoma
 Teinostoma
†Teinostomopsis
†Tejonia
†Telasco
†Teleochilus
†Teleoptyxis
 Telescopium
†Teliochilus
†Telleria
†Temanella
†Tembrockia
†Temnodiscus
†Temnospira
†Temnotropis
 Tenagodus
 Tenaturris
†Teneposita
†Tenuiactaeon
†Tenuicerithium
†Tenuiscala
†Tephlon
†Terebellopsis
 Terebellum
 Terebra
 Terebralia
†Terebraliopsis
†Terebrellina
†Terebrifusus
†Terebritoma
†Terefundus
†Terelimella
†Teremelon
†Teretia
†Teretrina
†Ternivoluta
†Tessarolax
 Testudinalia
†Tetranota
†Tetraplica
†Tetraptyxis
†Tetratubispira
 Thais
†Thaisella
†Thala
†Thalotia
†Thanetinassa
†Tharsiella
 Thatcheria
†Thecopsella
†Thelecythara
†Theliostyla
†Thericium
†Thersitea
†Thesbia
†Thiarinella
†Thierachella
†Tholitoma
†Thorista
Thoristella
†Threavia
†Thylacus
†Tianjinospira
†Tiara
†Tiaracerithium
†Tiarellacerithium
†Tiberia
†Tibersyrnola
†Tibia
†Tibiaporrhais
†Tibiella
†Tiburnus
†Timisia
†Tintorium
†Tioria
†Tipua
†Tmetonema
†Toledonia
†Tomellana
†Tomopleura
†Tomostoma
†Tomyris
 Tonna
†Torcula
†Torculoidella
†Torgnellus
†Torinia
†Tornatellaea
 Tornus
†Torquatiscala
†Torquesia
†Torquesiella
†Torquifer
†Tortisipho
†Tortoliva
†Tournouerella
†Touzinia
†Toxoconcha
†Trachelochetus
†Trachoecus
†Trachybembix
†Trachydomia
†Trachynerita
 Trachypollia
†Trachysma
†Trachyspira
†Trachytriton
†Tractoliria
†Tragula
†Trajana
†Trajanella
†Transmariaturris
†Transovula
†Transylvanella
†Tremanotus
†Trepospira
†Tretospira
†Triadoskenea
†Trianglospira
†Triangularia
†Triaracerithium
†Triassocirrus
†Tribia
†Trichosirius
 Trichotropis
 Tricolia
†Tricornis
†Tridactylus
†Triforis
†Trigonostoma
†Trimalaxis
 Trimusculus
 Triphora
†Tripia
†Tripidotomaria
†Triploca
†Tripterotyphis
 Triptychus
†Tristichotrochus
†Tritiaria
 Tritonalia
†Tritonatractus
†Tritonomangilia
†Tritonophon
†Tritonopsis
†Trituba
†Triumphis
 Trivia
†Triviella
†Trivirostra
†Trobus
†Trochacanthus
†Trochactaeon
†Trochactaeonina
†Trochalia
†Trochita
†Trochocerithium
†Trochodon
†Trochomphalus
†Trochonema
†Trochonemella
†Trochonemopsis
†Trochonerita
†Trochopsidea
†Trochotectus
†Trochotoma
†Trochotomaria
†Trochotrochus
†Trochotugurium
†Trochoturbella
 Trochus
†Trominina
Trona
†Troostella
†Tropaeas
 Trophon
†Trophonopsis
†Trophosycon
†Tropicolpus
†Tropidodiscus
Tropidophora
†Tropidostropha
†Tropisurcula
†Trubosta
†Truncaria
†Trunculariopsis
†Tryonella
†Trypanaxis
†Trypanocochlea
†Trypanostylus
†Trypanotoma
†Trypanotopsis
†Trypanotrochus
†Tubena
†Tuberleviathana
†Tubicauda
†Tubina
†Tubiola
†Tubomphalus
†Tudicla
†Tudiclana
†Tudicula
†Tudorella
†Tugali
†Tugurium
†Tulochilus
†Tumidiacirsa
 Tumulus (subfamily of Gibbula)
†Tundora
†Turbinea
 Turbinella
†Turbinilopsis
†Turbinopsis
 Turbo
†Turbocheilus
†Turboella
†Turboidea
†Turbonellina
 Turbonilla
†Turbonitella
†Turbonomaria
†Turbonopsis
 Turcica
†Turehua
†Turriclavis
†Turricolumbus
†Turricula
†Turriculina
†Turrifulger
†Turrina
†Turrinosyrinx
†Turriola
 Turris
†Turriscala
 Turritella
†Turritellopsis
†Turritoma
†Turritriton
†Tychobrachea
†Tychonia
†Tylocassis
Tylochilus
†Tylodinella
†Tylospira
†Tylostoma
†Tylotrochus
†Tylozone
†Tympanotonos
†Typhina
†Typhinellus
 Typhis
†Typhlomangelia
†Tyrannoberingius
†Tyrsoecus

U

†Uberella
†Uchauxia
†Ulfa
†Ulrichospira
†Umbilia
†Umbonellina
 Umbonium
†Umbospira
†Umbotrochus
†Umbotropis
 Umbraculum
†Umpquaia
†Undiscala
†Undulabucania
†Undularia
†Unedogemmula
†Unicarinata
Unitas
†Upella
†Urceolabrum
†Urgonella
†Urkutitoma
†Uromitra
 Urosalpinx
†Uttleya
†Uvanilla
†Uxia
†Uzita

V

†Vaderos
†Vaginella
†Valanginella
†Valfinia
 Vanikoro
†Vanikoropsis
†Vanitrochus
†Vanpalmer
†Varicobela
†Varicosipho
†Varicospira
†Varpalmeria
 Vasum
†Vaughanites
†Veatchia
†Velainella
†Velatella
†Velates
 Velutina
†Ventricaria
†Ventrilia
†Vergnesia
 Vermetus
 Vermicularia
†Vernedia
†Vernelia
†Verruturris
†Vesanula
†Vestulia
†Veterator
†Vetridrillia
†Vexillitra
 Vexillum
†Vexinia
†Vexithara
†Vicarya
†Vicaryella
†Vicetia
†Vicinocerithium
†Vigescentis
†Vincenturris
†Virgella
†Viridibuccinum
†Viriola
†Visitator
†Vistulia
 Vitrinella
†Vitrinellops
†Vitta
†Vitularia
†Vivanella
†Volema
Voluspa (subspecies of Pyramidella)
 Voluta
†Volutilithes
†Volutoconus
†Volutocorbis
†Volutoderma
†Volutolithes
 Volutomitra
†Volutomorpha
†Volutopsius
†Volutospina
 Volva
†Volvaria
†Volvariella
 Volvarina
†Volvarinella
†Volvocylindrites
Volvulella
†Voorwindia
†Vorticina
†Vouastia

W

†Waihaoia
†Waikura
†Waimatea
†Waipaoa
†Waisiolia
†Waitara
†Walnichollsia
†Waluia
†Wangacteon
†Wangaloa
†Warthia
†Wateletia
†Watsonia (subgenus of Parastrophia)
†Weeksia
†Wellergyi
†Wendella
†Westerna
†Wexfordia
†Whitecliffia
†Whitneya
†Whitneyella
 Williamia
†Willungia
†Wilsoniconcha
†Wisonsinella
†Woehrmannia
†Woodsalia
†Woodsella
†Worthenia
†Wortheniella
†Wortheniopsis
†Wyatella

X

 Xancus
†Xanthochorus
†Xenogalea
†Xenophalium
 Xenophora
 Xenotrophon
†Xenuroturris
†Xestosurcula
†Xizangospira
†Xuwenospira
†Xymene
†Xymenella
†Xystrella

Y

†Yasila
†Yingicus
†Yochelsonospira
†Yunnania

Z

†Zaclys
Zafra
†Zalipais
†Zalozone
†Zanassarina
†Zaphon
†Zardinistylus
†Zardubinihelix
Zaria (subgenus of Turritella)
Zeacolpus
†Zeacrypta
†Zeacumanthus
†Zeacuminia
†Zeadmete
†Zeapollia
 Zebina
†Zebittium
†Zefallacia
†Zegalerus
†Zeidora
†Zekilla
†Zelandiella
†Zemacies
†Zemira
†Zemitrella
†Zenbinostoma
†Zenepos
†-Zephos (synonym of Cominella)
†Zeradina
†Zethalia
†Zeuxis
†Zikkuratia
†Zinolia
†Zinsitys
†Zircia
†Zittelia
†Ziziphinus
†Zoila
 Zonaria
†Zonarina
†Zosterospira
†Zygites
†Zygopleura

References
Sepkoski, J.J., Jr. (2002). A compendium of fossil marine animal genera.  Bulletins of American Paleontology  364, 560 p.
Sepkoski's Online Genus Database
Fossilworks on  Paleobiology Database

 List of marine
Lists of prehistoric molluscs
.Fossil